Richard Kirby (28 January 1861 – 26 August 1947) was an Australian cricketer. He played four first-class matches for Tasmania between 1883 and 1884.

See also
 List of Tasmanian representative cricketers

References

External links
 

1861 births
1947 deaths
Australian cricketers
Tasmania cricketers
Cricketers from Hobart